The Battle of Amritsar took place on 12 January 1797 between the Durranis and the Sikh Misls as part of the Afghan-Sikh wars which ended with Sikh victory and retreat of Zaman Shah Durrani.

Background
On 11 January 1797, Amritsar was raided by a group of light cavalry of Durrani Empire, but they were defeated by the body of Sikhs in hand-to-hand combat with swords and spears. The Durrani soldiers fled and the Sikhs pursued them to a faraway distance. Upon the news of defeat of his army, Zaman Shah Durrani felt deeply insulted and marched towards Amritsar with the biggest share of his army. The Sikhs also prepared themselves by gathering an army of 50,000 soldiers.

Battle
On 12 January 1797, Zaman Shah Durrani and his army reached Amritsar where the Sikhs were readily awaiting for him, following which a furious battle took place which began at 8 in the morning with intense firing from the Durrani's camel artillery whereas the Sikhs returned fire with just their matchlocks. After the relentless battle continued till 2 in the afternoon, the Sikhs felt that they hadn't made an impact on the Durranis, therefore decided to lead the onslaught by charging directly at their opponents, as they were known to be much more effective in a close combat and so sped directly into the Durrani army with nothing but swords where the battle continued for about 4 more hours when the Durrani army started fleeing with Sikhs in their pursuit, all the way to the entrance of Lahore. The casualties on both sides were great but the following numbers seem to be exaggerated according to historians which states that abut 20,000 Durrani soldiers were killed while the Sikh casualties were 15,000 killed, an overall 35,000 casualties in the battle.

Aftermath
After Zaman Shah Durrani and his soldiers fled back, reaching Lahore at night, the Sikhs carefully patrolled Amritsar and mounted 7000 horsemen and 10,000 infantry within the fort. According to the Delhi chronicle, after the defeat and retreat of Zaman Shah Durrani back to Lahore, the people of Lahore rebelled against the Durranis for their bloody battle in Amritsar, which led Sher Muhammad Khan Wazir and two other Durrani chiefs to kill several people and plunder one street of Lahore for such defiance. Sometime after 15 January, a Durrani army contingent was sent to get intelligence on Amritsar but soon after they left Lahore, they were attacked by the body of Sikhs, causing the Durranis to flee back into the walls of Lahore, where about 300 were killed and wounded on both sides in this battle.

References 

Battles involving the Durrani Empire
Battles involving the Sikhs